Events from the year 1993 in Portuguese Macau.

Incumbents
 Governor - Vasco Joaquim Rocha Vieira

Events

November
 18 November - The inauguration of Grand Prix Museum in Sé.

 
Years of the 20th century in Macau
Macau
Macau
1990s in Macau